Donald F. Glut (born February 19, 1944) is an American writer, motion picture film director, and screenwriter. He is best known for writing the novelization of the second Star Wars film, The Empire Strikes Back.

Filmmaker

Amateur career 
From 1953 to 1969, Glut made a total of 41 amateur films, on subjects ranging from dinosaurs, to unauthorized adaptations of such characters as Superman, The Spirit, and Spider-Man.

Due to publicity he received in the pages of Forrest J Ackerman's magazine Famous Monsters of Filmland, Glut was able to achieve a degree of notoriety based on his work. This allowed him to increase the visibility of his films by obtaining the services of known actors such as Kenne Duncan and Glenn Strange, who reprised his most famous role as the Frankenstein Monster for Glut.

His final amateur film was 1969's Spider-Man, after which he moved into professional work full-time.

On October 3, 2006, Epoch Cinema released a two-DVD set of all 41 of Glut's amateur films titled I Was A Teenage Moviemaker. The total running time of both DVDs is 480 minutes, and includes a documentary about the making of those films, with interviews with Forrest J Ackerman, Randal Kleiser, Bob Burns, Jim Harmon, Scott Shaw, Paul Davids, Bill Warren, and others.

Professional career
Over the next decades, Glut pursued a variety of professions in the entertainment field. He worked heavily as a screenwriter, mostly in children's television on shows such as Shazam!, Land of the Lost, Spider-Man, Transformers, Challenge of the GoBots, Spider-Man and His Amazing Friends, DuckTales, Tarzan, Lord of the Jungle, The Super Powers Team: Galactic Guardians, G.I. Joe: A Real American Hero, X-Men, and many more.

He also claimed to have created some of the characters and much of the back story for the Masters of the Universe toy line, which served as the basis for the TV show.

With the release of 1996's Dinosaur Valley Girls, Glut began a professional directing career that has seen him helm several exploitation-style films, such as The Erotic Rites of Countess Dracula (2001), The Mummy's Kiss (2003), Countess Dracula's Orgy of Blood (2004), The Mummy's Kiss: 2nd Dynasty (2006), and Blood Scarab (2007). More recently he wrote and directed Dances with Werewolves (2017) and Tales of Frankenstein (2018).

Writer
Having been a classmate and friend of George Lucas at the University of Southern California, Lucas approached Glut to write the novelization of A New Hope, but Glut turned him down due to the low pay and the fact the Lucas' name would be on the cover. Glut then wrote the novelization of The Empire Strikes Back (1980). While working on the novel, he had somewhat of a negative experience due to the fact that knowledge of the film was segmented inside Lucasfilm.    Glut has written approximately 65 published books, both novels, and nonfiction, plus numerous children's books based on franchises. Many of his nonfiction books have been about dinosaurs, including Dinosaur Dictionary and the Dinosaurs: The Encyclopedia series of reference works.

Glut created and wrote several series for Western Publishing's line of Gold Key Comics including The Occult Files of Dr. Spektor, Dagar the Invincible, and Tragg and the Sky Gods. At Marvel Comics, he wrote Captain America, The Invaders, Kull the Destroyer, Solomon Kane, Star Wars, and What If...?. His work for Warren Publishing included Creepy, Eerie, and Vampirella.  More recently, Glut has been working for Warrant Publishing Company, a company that is publishing magazines as an homage to Warren Publishing's past work using similar layouts and artwork.  Glut is working as an associate editor and writer on some of Warrant's homage titles such as The Creeps and Vampiress Carmilla.

Musician
1967–1968 Glut played bass for The Penny Arkade. They recorded only one album, produced by Michael Nesmith of the Monkees. The album was not released until 2004 as a limited Record Store Day LP/CD by Sundazed Records.

Selected bibliography

Books
The Dinosaur Dictionary (1972)
The Frankenstein Legend: A Tribute to Mary Shelley and Boris Karloff (1973)
The Dracula Book (1975)
Spawn (#43) (1976)
The Great Television Heroes (1975)
The Dinosaur Scrapbook (1980)
The Empire Strikes Back (1980) (novelization)
The New Dinosaur Dictionary (1982)
Classic Movie Monsters (1991)
The Complete Dinosaur Dictionary (1992)
Chomper (Dinotopia No. 11) (2000)
Jurassic Classics: A Collection of Saurian Essays and Mesozoic Musings (2000)
The Frankenstein Archive: Essays on the Monster, the Myth, the Movies, and More (2002)
True Vampires of History (1971)
True Werewolves of History (2004)
Shock Theatre, Chicago Style: WBKB-TV's Late Night Horror Showcase, 1957-1959 (2012)

Comics bibliography

Archie Comics
 Chilling Adventures in Sorcery #4 (1973)
 Mad House #95 (1974)  
 Red Circle Sorcery #8, 11 (1974–1975)

Charlton Comics
 Ghost Manor #29 (1976)
 Ghostly Haunts #50 (1976)
 Ghostly Tales #125, 163 (1977–1983)

DC Comics
 House of Mystery #227, 259, 290 (1974–1981)  
 House of Secrets #121 (1974)

Gold Key Comics/Western Publishing
 Dr. Spektor Presents Spine-Tingling Tales #1–4 (1975–1976)
 Gold Key Spotlight #6, 8–9 (1977)
 Grimm's Ghost Stories #24, 35, 38 (1975–1977)
 The Little Monsters #27, 36, 38, 43–44 (1974–1978)
 Mystery Comics Digest #1–21, 23–26 (1972–1975)
 The Occult Files of Dr. Spektor #1–25 (1973–1982)
 Tales of Sword and Sorcery: Dagar the Invincible #1–19 (1972–1982)
 Tragg and the Sky Gods #1–9 (1975–1982)

Marvel Comics
 Arrgh #3 (1975)  
 Captain America #217–221 (1978)  
 Ghost Rider (vol. 2) #22 (1977) 
 Invaders #29–31, 34, 37–41 (1978–1979) 
 Kull the Destroyer #21–29 (1977–1978) 
 Marvel Premiere #36–37 (3-D Man) (1977) 
 Marvel Preview #19 (1979)  
 Savage Sword of Conan #19, 22, 25–26, 33–34, 37, 39, 46, 49, 53–54 (Solomon Kane backup stories) (1977–1980)
 Star Wars #10 (1978)
 Thor #279 (1979)  
 Unknown Worlds of Science Fiction #5–6, Annual #1 (1975–1976) 
 Vampire Tales #5 (text article) (1974) 
 What If...? #5, 7–10, 12, 14, 22 (1977–1980)  
 X-Men Adventures #4 (1993)

Now Comics
 The Twilight Zone #1 (1990)

Skywald Publications
 Psycho #8 (1972)

Warren Publishing
 Creepy #29–32, 42 (1969–1971)
 Eerie #25, 30, 32, 36, 39–41, 51, 125 (1969–1981)
 Vampirella #1–5, 8–9, 16, 18–19, 23, 37, 90, Annual #1 (1969–1980)

Television credits
Shazam! (1974)
Land of the Lost (1975)
Space Sentinels (1977)
Captain Caveman and the Teen Angels (1977-1980)
The New Shmoo (1979)
Spider-Man (1981-1982)
The Biskitts (1983)
Monchhichis (1983)
Mighty Orbots (1984)
The Transformers (1984-1986)
Challenge of the GoBots (1985)
G.I. Joe: A Real American Hero (1985)
Foofur (1986)
The Centurions (1986)
DuckTales (1987)
Sky Commanders (1987)
Dino-Riders (1988)
RoboCop (1988)
Transformers: Generation 2 (1993)
X-Men (1993)
Bureau of Alien Detectors (1996)

Discography

The Penny Arkade
 Not the Freeze (Sundazed, 2004)

References

Further reading
 "The Occult Files of Donald F. Glut: An Interview with the Creator of Dr. Spektor". Interview by Scott Aaron Stine. Trashfiend vol. 1, no. 3 (Jan.-March 2003) pp. 20–23.

External links
 
 
 Frontline Entertainment Glut's production company website.
 I Was A Teenage Movie Maker Website devoted to Glut's amateur films.

1944 births
20th-century American writers
21st-century American writers
American comics writers
American male screenwriters
Inkpot Award winners
Living people
People from Pecos, Texas
Screenwriters from Texas